This a list of mayors of Kingston, Ontario.

References 
 Machar, Agnes Maule. The Story of Old Kingston Musson: Toronto, 1908. pp290–291
 "The Mayors of Kingston since the City's Incorporation 150 Years Ago" Kingston Whig-Standard 28 January 1988
 City of Kingston Directories 1982-1994
 The Dictionary of Canadian Biography Online
 Global News | Paterson replaces out-going Gerretsen as mayor of Kingston

Kingston, Ontario
1838 establishments in Canada